Rail regulations in Canada are set by Transport Canada and the Canadian Transportation Agency.  The 2007 "Railway Safety Act Review" was commissioned by the Minister of Transport and its report provides much-needed background to this article, especially section 4.3.  The governance of railways in Canada is complex and has many tiers: Acts of Parliament, Regulations, Rules, and Directives are only some of the instruments that impact this industry.

Scope
Federal regulations apply only to certain railways which meet one or more of the following conditions:
 They operate in more than one province.
 They operate from the United States and cross the Canada–United States border.
They are owned, controlled, leased or operated by a person who operates a railway that is within the jurisdiction of parliament.
They are declared by the Canadian Parliament to be a work for the general advantage of Canada or of two or more provinces. 
A railway that is regulated under either of the two last qualifications is considered to be "a work for the general advantage of Canada."

List of 32 Federal Railway Companies
The following is a list of all federal railway companies
 6970184 Canada (Great Sandhills Railway)
Arnaud Railway Company
BNSF Railway
Canadian National Railway
Canadian Pacific Railway
City of Ottawa (O-Train Trillium Line)
CSX Transportation
Eastern Maine Railway
Essex Terminal Railway
Ferroequus Railway (suspended)
Goderich-Exeter Railway
Great Canadian Railtour  (Rocky Mountaineer)
Hudson Bay Railway
International Bridge and Terminal Company
Kelowna Pacific Railway
Maine Central Railroad
Minnesota, Dakota and Western Railway
Montreal, Maine & Atlantic Railway (suspended)
National Railroad Passenger Corporation (Amtrak)
Nipissing Central Railway (a portion of the Ontario Northland Railway)
Okanagan Valley Railway
Quebec North Shore & Labrador Railway
RaiLink Canada (Ottawa Valley Railway)
St. Lawrence & Atlantic Railroad
Springfield Terminal Railway 
Sydney Coal Railway
Toronto Terminals Railway
Tshiuetin Rail Transportation
Union Pacific Railroad
Via Rail Canada
Wabush Lake Railway
White Pass & Yukon Route

Provincial Charters 
Railways can also be licensed by the provinces, under applicable provincial railway safety legislation. The only provinces without railways under their jurisdiction as of 2007 are in Newfoundland and Labrador, and in Prince Edward Island.  In Ontario, railways licensed under the Shortline Railways Act, 1995 can operate within that province, but not cross provincial or international boundaries. 

In New Brunswick. shortline railways are governed by the Shortline Railways Act, 2011. The prior Act was in force since 1994, with amendments also made in 2013. 

Alternatively, "several railways are operating that do not have certificates of fitness from the CTA [Transport Canada], and are not regulated under corresponding provincial railway safety legislation". These are mainly commuter railways.

Tracks
Transport Canada's Rules Respecting Track Safety apply to all federally regulated railway companies operating on standard gauge track. As a consequence, the narrow gauge White Pass & Yukon Route railway is excluded from these regulations.

Speed
Though Canada uses kilometres per hour on roadways, rail speed limits are set in miles per hour (mph).
Tracks are classified and the speed limit is determined by the type. The track class speed limits are nearly identical to the speed limits set by the Federal Railway Administration in the United States.

Special rules
Trains pulling service equipment cars, rolling stock used to transport or house Maintenance of Way equipment or employees may not exceed .
Vehicles being used for a visual inspection of tracks may not exceed  when crossing other tracks, highways or switches.

Interswitching
Interswitching by a terminal railway is regulated by the Canadian Transportation Agency. Regulations do not apply where 90% the railway's gross revenue comes from interswitching.

In situations where the regulations apply, terminal railways are required to give equal treatment interswitching traffic and are prohibited from charging for delivery or return of an empty car. They are required to follow a rate schedule set by the CTA.

Railway police

Any superior court judge may appoint a person as a police constable charged with enforcing federal and provincial laws as well as Part 3 of the Canadian Transportation Act in regards to railway property. Section 44 of the Railway Safety Act limits jurisdiction of Railway constables to property owned, used or managed by the railway and the area  around it.

Work and Rest Rules

Transport Canada limits the on duty time on a single shift for engineers, conductors and yard workers and all workers involved in switching or operating trains to 12 hours, including those working split shifts. The exception is work train crews, who may work 16 hours. The total maximum over multiple shifts is 18 hours.

To reset the clock, a worker must receive 8 hours off at their home terminal or 6 hours away from home.

Emergencies

During emergencies, defined as unforeseen situations that may cause harm to employees, passengers, the public or the environment such as accidents, derailments, natural disasters and acts of God but not locomotive breakdowns or broken rails, employees may work until relieved subject to fatigue management policies.

See also

 Railroad operations
 Speed limits in the United States (rail)

References

External links
Rail Transportation - Transport Canada
Rail Transportation - Canadian Transportation Agency

Canadian transport law
Rail infrastructure in Canada
Rail transport in Canada
Regulation in Canada
Canada